The 2021 FIBA Under-19 Basketball World Cup (Latvian: 2021. gada FIBA Pasaules kauss basketbolā līdz 19 gadu vecumam) was the 15th edition of the FIBA Under-19 Basketball World Cup, the biennial international men's youth basketball championship contested by the U19 national teams of the member associations of FIBA. The tournament was hosted in Riga and Daugavpils, Latvia from 3 to 11 July 2021.

The United States defeated France in the final to capture their eighth title.

Venues

Qualified teams

China withdrew before the competition due to strict anti-epidemic measures. They were replaced by Iran.

Draw
The draw took place on 28 April 2021 in Berlin, Germany.

Seeding
On 27 April 2021, the pots were announced.

Preliminary round
All times are local (UTC+3).

Group A

Group B

Group C

Group D

Knockout stage

Bracket

5–8th place bracket

9–16th place bracket

13–16th place bracket

Round of 16

9–16th place quarterfinals

Quarterfinals

13–16th place semifinals

9–12th place semifinals

5–8th place semifinals

Semifinals

15th place game

13th place game

Eleventh place game

Ninth place game

Seventh place game

Fifth place game

Third place game

Final

Final standings

Statistics and awards

Statistical leaders

Players

Points

Rebounds

Assists

Blocks

Steals

Efficiency

Teams

Points

Rebounds

Assists

Blocks

Steals

Efficiency

Awards
The awards were announced on 11 July 2021.

References

External links
Official website
Tournament summary

2021
FIBA Under-19 World Championship
FIBA
2021 in Latvian sport
Sports competitions in Riga
Sport in Daugavpils
International youth basketball competitions hosted by Latvia